Deneke is a surname. Notable people with the surname include:

Helena Deneke (1878–1973), British Germanist at Oxford University
Marlies Deneke (born 1953), German politician
Volrad Deneke (1920–2006), German politician

See also 
Death of Brian Deneke